KBGB (105.7 FM) is a radio station broadcasting a country music format. Licensed to Magness, Arkansas, United States, the station is currently owned by Crain Media Group, LLC.

References

External links
 

BGB